David Manuel Córdova Pinto (born 30 March 1984) is a Chilean former footballer.

He played for Magallanes.

References
 
 

1984 births
Living people
Footballers from Santiago
Chilean footballers
Unión Española footballers
Ferroviarios footballers
Magallanes footballers
Trasandino footballers
Deportes Iquique footballers
Puerto Montt footballers
Rangers de Talca footballers
Deportes Magallanes footballers
Chilean Primera División players
Tercera División de Chile players
Primera B de Chile players
Association football forwards